Glasgow Perthshire Football Club are a Scottish football club based in Possilpark, in the north of Glasgow. Nicknamed the Shire, they were formed on 7 November 1890 at the Waterloo Rooms in Glasgow and play at Keppoch Park, close to Saracen Park, home of Ashfield.

Named after the Glasgow Perthshire Society, they were once one of the top junior sides in the country, but success has been scant in recent years.

They pulled out of all competitive fixtures for the 2007–08 season, but re-entered for the 2008–09 season.

Notable former players

The following ex-Perthshire players were capped for Scotland.
 Bobby Campbell - Chelsea
 Jimmy Connor - Sunderland
 Jimmy Lawrence - Newcastle United
 Tom Sloan - Third Lanark
 James Stark - Rangers
 Robert Thomson - Celtic

Honours

Scottish Junior Cup
Winners: 1931–32, 1940–41, 1943–44

Other Honours
West of Scotland Cup winners: 1939–40
Central League B Division winners / overall champions: 1976–77
Central League A Division runners-up: 1979–80 
Central Division One winners: 1984–85, 2011–12
West Central Second Division winners: 2001–02, 2016–17
Glasgow Junior Cup: 1913–14

References

 
Football clubs in Scotland
Scottish Junior Football Association clubs
Football clubs in Glasgow
Association football clubs established in 1890
1890 establishments in Scotland
West of Scotland Football League teams